Autar Singh Paintal  (24 September 1925 – 21 December 2004) was a medical scientist who made pioneering discoveries in the area of neurosciences and respiratory sciences. He is the first Indian Physiologist to become the Fellow of the Royal Society, London.

He was a merit student and did his post graduation in physiology from King George Medical College, Lucknow.

Paintal completed his PhD under the supervision of David Whitteridge at the University of Edinburgh.

His major contribution to the world of science is the development of a single-fiber technique for recording afferent impulses from individual sensory receptors. Paintal discovered several sensory receptors including atrial B receptors, pulmonary J-receptors, ventricular pressure receptors, stomach stretch receptors, and muscle pain receptors. They have set the beginning of new era in physiological understanding.

Paintal returned to India in 1953 and joined All India Institute of Medical Sciences, New Delhi. He later became Director of the Vallabhai Patel Chest Institute. He was also the first Principal of University College of Medical Sciences, Delhi.  Paintal subsequently was elevated to Director General of the Indian Council of Medical Research and he was also the founder president of Society of Scientific Values.

Paintal had 3 children by his first wife Iris Paintal. His second daughter Priti Paintal is a music composer in the UK. His second wife Dr Ashima Anand-Paintal is also a scientist.

References

External links 
 A.S. Paintal — a celebrated physiologist 
 
 Obituary from Indian Journal of Chest Diseases and Allied Sciences

1925 births
2004 deaths
Indian physiologists
Indian Sikhs
Fellows of the Royal Society
Academic staff of the All India Institute of Medical Sciences, New Delhi
Alumni of the University of Edinburgh
King George's Medical University alumni
University of Lucknow alumni
TWAS fellows
Recipients of the Padma Vibhushan in medicine